Suwandi Siswoyo (born 10 March 1972 in Gresik Regency) is an Indonesian football player and manager who previously plays as defender for Persegres Gresik, Petrokimia Putra, Persija Jakarta, PSM Makassar, Perseden Denpasar, Persib Bandung, PKT Bontang, Persita Tangerang, Mitra Kukar FC and the Indonesia national team.

Club statistics

Hounors

Club
PSM Makassar
 Liga Indonesia Premier Division runner-up: 2001

Petrokimia Putra
 Liga Indonesia Premier Division: 2002

References

External links
 Profil in Jawa Pos

1972 births
Association football defenders
Living people
Indonesian footballers
Indonesia international footballers
Persegres Gresik players
Petrokimia Putra players
Persija Jakarta players
PSM Makassar players
Perseden Denpasar players
Persib Bandung players
PKT Bontang players
Persita Tangerang players
Mitra Kukar players
Indonesian Premier Division players
People from Gresik Regency
Sportspeople from East Java